Hani Mohsin Mohd. Hanafi (18 June 1965 – 25 July 2006)  was a Malaysian actor, host and producer. He best known as the host of the popular TV game show Roda Impian, the Malaysian version of Wheel of Fortune.

He died on 25 July 2006 at the age of 41 due to a heart attack; Roda Impian ended its production as a symbol of respect for his death.  It aired a brief revival in 2009 with disc jockey Kieran as host; the show has been on indefinite hiatus since 2010.

He was previously married to actress Tiara Jacquelina, from 11 September 1993 until their divorce on 16 February 1998. Hani was buried beside the grave of his mother, Hasni Bakar at the Ulu Klang Muslim cemetery.

Filmography

Film

Television series

Telemovie

Television

References

External links
 

1965 births
2006 deaths
Malaysian people of Malay descent
Malaysian male actors
Malaysian television personalities
People from Perlis
Malaysian Muslims